The 1100s BC is a decade which lasted from 1109 BC to 1100 BC.

Events and trends
 1104 BC—Foundation of Cadiz, Spain.
 c. 1100 BC—Maya Calendar counts time from this point.
 1100 BC—Tiglath-Pileser I of Assyria conquers the Hittites.
 c. 1100 BC—The Dorians invade Ancient Greece.
 c. 1100 BC—Mycenaean era ends with the destruction of that civilization. The collapse of Mycenaean dominance starts.
 c. 1100 BC—Late Minoan culture ends.
 c. 1100 BC—Greek Dark Ages begin.
 c. 1100 BC—Beginning of the proto-Villanovan culture in northern Italy.
 c. 1100 BC—The New Kingdom in Egypt comes to an end.
 c. 1100 BC—Shang Dynasty ends in China.
 c. 1100 BC—Kurukshetra War begins in Later Vedic period in Kuru Kingdom.

Significant people
 c. 1102 BC—Samuel is born.
 c. 1100 BC—Zarathustra is born.

Inventions, discoveries, introductions
 Alphabet developed by Phoenicians.
 MUL.APIN developed by Assyrians: an ancient catalog of constellations.

References